Leslie Ventura Rowe (born 1947) is a retired career diplomat who served as the American Ambassador to Mozambique (2010-2012) as well as Papua New Guinea, Solomon Islands and Vanuatu (2006-2009).  In January 2013, she joined the new U.S. Office of Global Health Diplomacy.  Previously, she was Deputy Chief of Mission at the U.S. Embassy in Nairobi, Kenya.

Education
Rowe received a B.A. from Washington State University, an M.A. from the Fletcher School of Law and Diplomacy at Tufts University and an M.Ed. from Northeastern University.

References

1947 births
Living people
Washington State University alumni
The Fletcher School at Tufts University alumni
Northeastern University alumni
United States Foreign Service personnel
American women ambassadors
Ambassadors of the United States to Papua New Guinea
Ambassadors of the United States to the Solomon Islands
Ambassadors of the United States to Vanuatu
Ambassadors of the United States to Mozambique
21st-century American diplomats
21st-century American women